Howard Yu is a Hong Kong-born academic and author who is the LEGO® professor of management and innovation at IMD Business School. He has been the director of the IMD's Center for Future Readiness since 2020. He is also the director of Advanced Management Program (AMP) and Future Readiness Strategy (FRS) open program of IMD.

Yu is the author of the book, Leap. He has been a regular contributor on Harvard Business Review, MIT Sloan Management Review, Channel News Asia, and Forbes.

Early life and education
Born in Hong Kong, Yu holds a BBA from the University of Hong Kong and a DBA in general management from Harvard Business School, which he completed under the supervision of Clayton Christensen and Joseph Bower.

Career
In 2018, his book, Leap: How to Thrive in a World Where Everything Can be Copied, was published. It was also included in Strategy+Business list. The book was also included in Inc.'s Best Strategy Books of 2018. It was awarded a gold medal of the Axiom business book awards in 2019.

In 2020, he became the director of the IMD Center for Future Readiness, which was established with the help of The LEGO Group.
 
Howard is the current LEGO® professor at the IMD Business School.

His other works include Future Readiness Indicator, which he developed to gauge post-pandemic economy.

Research
His research focuses on what generates sustainable growth and what holds back firms and companies. He studies innovation across sectors to find trends and enabling technology.

His recent work includes Future Readiness Indicators for several industries to gauge industry incumbents' preparedness.

Bibliography
 Yu, Howard H.; Shih, Willy C. (2018). Taiwan's PC Industry, 1976–2010: The Evolution of Organizational Capabilities
 Yu, Howard (2018). Leap: How to Thrive in a World Where Everything Can be Copied

Honors and awards
 Poets & Quants Business School Professors Under 40
 European Foundation for Management Development Award
 The Case Centre Award

References

External links
 Howard Yu, IMD Business School for Management and Leadership, Professor of Management and Innovation

Living people
Hong Kong writers
Alumni of the University of Hong Kong
Harvard Business School alumni
Year of birth missing (living people)